Jake Christiansen Stadium is a sports complex on the campus of Concordia College in Moorhead, Minnesota. It is primarily used for college football and other athletic events. It was named to honor long-time coach Jake Christiansen who built a successful football program at the school. The stadium has a seating capacity of 7,000.

Improvements to the facility over time include field turf in 2010 and additional facility expansion in 2013.

References

External links
 Jake Christiansen Stadium official web page

College football venues
Concordia Cobbers football
American football venues in Minnesota
Buildings and structures in Clay County, Minnesota
Moorhead, Minnesota
Soccer venues in Minnesota